The 2022 Hennepin County Attorney election was held on November 8, 2022, to elect the County attorney of Hennepin County, Minnesota. On September 1, 2021, incumbent county attorney Michael O. Freeman announced that he would retire at the end of his term after 24 years in the role. Former Hennepin County Chief Public Defender Mary Moriarty defeated former Hennepin County judge Martha Holton Dimick and became the first openly LGBTQ woman elected as Hennepin County Attorney.

Primary election

Candidates

Advanced to general
Martha Holton Dimick, former Minneapolis deputy city attorney and former judge of Minnesota's 4th judicial district
Mary Moriarty, former chief public defender of Hennepin County

Eliminated in primary
Jarvis Jones, attorney and former president of the Minnesota State Bar Association
Tad Jude, former judge of Minnesota's 10th judicial district
Paul Ostrow, former Minneapolis city council president and candidate for Minnesota's 5th congressional district in 2006
Saraswati Singh, assistant Ramsey County prosecutor and former assistant attorney general
Ryan Winkler, majority leader of the Minnesota House of Representatives

Withdrawn
Simon Trautmann, attorney and Richfield city councilman

Declined
Cedrick Frazier, state representative (endorsed Moriarty)
Michael O. Freeman, incumbent county attorney (endorsed Dimick)

Endorsements

Forum

Results

General election

Forum and debate
A candidate forum was held on September 29. A debate was held on October 14 on Twin Cities Public Television's Almanac program.

Endorsements
Endorsements in bold were made after the primary.

Results

References

Notes

External links
Official campaign websites
Martha Holton Dimick for County Attorney
Jarvis Jones for County Attorney
Mary Moriarty for County Attorney
Paul Ostro for County Attorney
Saraswati Singh for County Attorney
Simon Trautmann for County Attorney
Ryan Winkler for County Attorney

Hennepin County Attorney
Hennepin County Attorney
Hennepin County Attorney 2022